Gustavo Sánchez Parra (born 30 September 1966) is a Mexican actor. He has appeared in more than ninety films since 2000.

Selected filmography

References

External links 

1966 births
Living people
Mexican male film actors